La Trace de Kandia is a 2014 Franco-Guinean documentary film directed by Laurent Chevallier. The film reveals the story of Guinean singer Ibrahima Sory Kouyaté, who is also known as the Kandia or the Golden Voice of Manding. He is also the first iconic singer of independent Africa. The film received positive reviews from critics.

References

External links 
 

2014 films
2014 documentary films
French documentary films
2010s French films